The Da Prata River is a river in Minas Gerais, Brazil. It is a tributary of the Paracatu River.

See also
 List of rivers of Minas Gerais

References
 Map from Ministry of Transport
 Rand McNally, The New International Atlas, 1993.

Rivers of Minas Gerais